The 2013–14 New York Knicks season was the 68th season of the franchise in the National Basketball Association (NBA). The Knicks came up just short this season as they failed to make the playoffs, leaving the 2012-13 season to be the last time the Knicks qualified for the postseason until the 2020-21 season.

Key dates
January 24: Carmelo Anthony scores career and the franchise high 62 Points in a 125–96 win against the Charlotte Bobcats.

Draft picks

Roster

Pre-season

|- style="background:#cfc;"
| 1 
| October 9
| @ Boston
| 
| Iman Shumpert (18)
| Chandler & Aldrich (5)
| Raymond Felton (5)
| Dunkin' Donuts Center10,404
| 1–0
|- style="background:#fcc;"
| 2 
| October 11
| @ Toronto
| 
| Carmelo Anthony (24)
| Iman Shumpert (9)
| Beno Udrih (5)
| Air Canada Centre15,357
| 1–1
|- style="background:#fcc;"
| 3 
| October 12
| @ Boston
| 
| Ike Diogu (21)
| Ike Diogu (8)
| Chris Douglas-Roberts (3)
| Verizon Wireless Arena9,391
| 1–2
|- style="background:#cfc;"
| 4 
| October 17
| @ Washington
| 
| Carmelo Anthony (22)
| Ike Diogu (8)
| Carmelo Anthony (4)
| Baltimore Arena12,376
| 2–2
|- style="background:#fcc;"
| 5 
| October 21
| @ Toronto
| 
| Beno Udrih (19)
| Carmelo Anthony (8)
| Beno Udrih (7)
| Air Canada Centre15,701
| 2–3
|- style="background:#fcc;"
| 6 
| October 23
| @ Milwaukee
| 
| Carmelo Anthony (22)
| Carmelo Anthony (9)
| Carmelo Anthony (7)
| Resch Center5,609
| 2–4
|- style="background:#fcc;"
| 7 
| October 25
| Charlotte
| 
| Iman Shumpert (16)
| Tyson Chandler (9)
| Raymond Felton (5)
| Madison Square Garden19,812
| 2–5

Regular season

Standings

Game log

|- style="background:#cfc;"
| 1 
| October 30
| Milwaukee
| 
| Carmelo Anthony (19)
| Carmelo Anthony (10)
| Pablo Prigioni (5)
| Madison Square Garden19,812
| 1–0
|- style="background:#fcc;"
| 2 
| October 31
| @ Chicago
| 
| Carmelo Anthony (22)
| Tyson Chandler (19)
| Anthony & Felton (6)
| United Center22,022
| 1–1

|- style="background:#fcc;"
| 3 
| November 3
| Minnesota
| 
| Carmelo Anthony (22)
| Carmelo Anthony (17)
| Raymond Felton (12)
| Madison Square Garden19,812
| 1–2
|- style="background:#fcc;"
| 4 
| November 5
| Charlotte
| 
| Carmelo Anthony (32)
| Felton & World Peace (6)
| Anthony, Felton, Shumpert (2)
| Madison Square Garden19,812
| 1–3
|- style="background:#cfc;"
| 5 
| November 8
| @ Charlotte
| 
| Carmelo Anthony (28)
| Anthony & Bargnani (8)
| Carmelo Anthony (6)
| Time Warner Cable Arena16,465
| 2–3
|- style="background:#fcc;"
| 6 
| November 10
| San Antonio
| 
| Anthony & Bargnani (16)
| Carmelo Anthony (8)
| Smith, World Peace, Aldrich (3)
| Madison Square Garden19,812
| 2–4
|- style="background:#cfc;"
| 7 
| November 13
| @ Atlanta
| 
| Carmelo Anthony (25)
| Andrea Bargnani (11)
| Iman Shumpert (9)
| Philips Arena15,057
| 3–4
|- style="background:#fcc;"
| 8 
| November 14
| Houston
| 
| Carmelo Anthony (45)
| Carmelo Anthony (10)
| Raymond Felton (7)
| Madison Square Garden19,812
| 3–5
|- style="background:#fcc;"
| 9 
| November 16
| Atlanta
| 
| Carmelo Anthony (23)
| Carmelo Anthony (12)
| Raymond Felton (5)
| Madison Square Garden19,812
| 3–6
|- style="background:#fcc;"
| 10 
| November 19
| @ Detroit
| 
| Carmelo Anthony (25)
| Anthony, Martin (7)
| Pablo Prigioni (5)
| Palace of Auburn Hills13,213
| 3–7
|- style="background:#fcc;"
| 11 
| November 20
| Indiana
| 
| Carmelo Anthony (30)
| Carmelo Anthony (18)
| Beno Udrih (4)
| Madison Square Garden19,812
| 3–8
|- style="background:#fcc;"
| 12 
| November 23
| @ Washington
| 
| Carmelo Anthony (23)
| Carmelo Anthony (12)
| Andrea Bargnani (5)
| Verizon Center18,089
| 3–9
|- style="background:#fcc;"
| 13 
| November 25
| @ Portland
|  
| Carmelo Anthony (34)
| Carmelo Anthony (15)
| Kenyon Martin (6)
| Moda Center19,939
| 3–10
|- style="background:#fcc;"
| 14 
| November 27
| @ L.A. Clippers
| 
| Carmelo Anthony (27)
| Andrea Bargnani (10)
| Raymond Felton (7)
| Staples Center19,270
| 3–11
|- style="background:#fcc;"
| 15 
| November 29
| @ Denver
| 
| Carmelo Anthony (27)
| Carmelo Anthony (7)
| Raymond Felton (7)
| Pepsi Center19,155
| 3–12

|- style="background:#fcc;"
| 16 
| December 1
| New Orleans
| 
| Carmelo Anthony (23)
| Carmelo Anthony (10)
| Raymond Felton (8)
| Madison Square Garden19,812
| 3–13
|- style="background:#cfc;"
| 17 
| December 5
| @ Brooklyn
| 
| Carmelo Anthony (19)
| Carmelo Anthony (10)
| Carmelo Anthony (6)
| Barclays Center17,732
| 4–13
|- style="background:#cfc;"
| 18 
| December 6
| Orlando
| 
| Carmelo Anthony (20)
| Carmelo Anthony (11)
| Pablo Prigioni (6)
| Madison Square Garden19,812
| 5–13
|- style="background:#fcc;"
| 19 
| December 8
| Boston
| 
| Carmelo Anthony (19)
| Carmelo Anthony (5)
| Pablo Prigioni (4)
| Madison Square Garden19,812
| 5–14
|- style="background:#fcc;"
| 20 
| December 10
| @ Cleveland
| 
| Carmelo Anthony (29)
| Carmelo Anthony (8)
| Pablo Prigioni (9)
| Quicken Loans Arena14,580
| 5–15
|- style="background:#cfc;"
| 21 
| December 11
| Chicago
| 
| Carmelo Anthony (30)
| Carmelo Anthony (10)
| Carmelo Anthony (4)
| Madison Square Garden19,812
| 6–15
|- style="background:#fcc;"
| 22 
| December 13
| @ Boston
| 
| Carmelo Anthony (26)
| Kenyon Martin (7)
| Pablo Prigioni (8)
| TD Garden17,479
| 6–16
|- style="background:#cfc;"
| 23 
| December 14
| Atlanta
|  
| Carmelo Anthony (35)
| Carmelo Anthony (6)
| Pablo Prigioni (6)
| Madison Square Garden19,812
| 7–16
|- style="background:#fcc;"
| 24 
| December 16
| Washington
|  
| Carmelo Anthony (32)
| Iman Shumpert (9)
| J. R. Smith (6)
| Madison Square Garden19,812
| 7–17
|- style="background:#cfc;"
| 25 
| December 18
| @ Milwaukee
|  
| Carmelo Anthony (32)
| Andrea Bargnani (10)
| J. R. Smith (6)
| BMO Harris Bradley Center11,869
| 8–17
|- style="background:#fcc;"
| 26 
| December 21
| Memphis
| 
| Carmelo Anthony (30)
| Carmelo Anthony (7)
| J. R. Smith (7)
| Madison Square Garden19,812
| 8–18
|- style="background:#cfc;"
| 27 
| December 23
| @ Orlando
| 
| Carmelo Anthony (19)
| Tyson Chandler (13)
| Beno Udrih (6)
| Amway Center15,105
| 9–18
|- style="background:#fcc;"
| 28 
| December 25
| Oklahoma City
|  
| Amar'e Stoudemire (22)
| Tyson Chandler (9)
| Beno Udrih (6)
| Madison Square Garden19,812
| 9–19
|- style="background:#fcc;"
| 29 
| December 27
| Toronto
| 
| Andrea Bargnani (18)
| Andrea Bargnani (12)
| Beno Udrih (10)
| Madison Square Garden19,812
| 9–20
|- style="background:#fcc;"
| 30 
| December 28
| @ Toronto
| 
| Amar'e Stoudemire (23)
| Amar'e Stoudemire (9)
| J.R. Smith, Toure Murry (6)
| Air Canada Centre19,800
| 9–21

|- style="background:#cfc;"
| 31 
| January 2
| @ San Antonio
| 
| Carmelo Anthony, Iman Shumpert (27)
| Carmelo Anthony (12)
| Beno Udrih (7)
| AT&T Center18,581
| 10–21
|- style="background:#fcc;"
| 32 
| January 3
| @ Houston
| 
| Iman Shumpert (26)
| Tyson Chandler (11)
| Beno Udrih (7)
| Toyota Center18,304
| 10–22
|- style="background:#cfc;"
| 33 
| January 5
| @ Dallas
| 
| Carmelo Anthony (19)
| three players (7)
| Beno Udrih (8)
| American Airlines Center19,892
| 11–22
|- style="background:#cfc;"
| 34 
| January 7
| Detroit
| 
| Carmelo Anthony (34)
| Andrea Bargnani (11)
| Raymond Felton (6)
| Madison Square Garden19,812
| 12–22
|- style="background:#cfc;"
| 35 
| January 9
| Miami
| 
| Carmelo Anthony (29)
| Amar'e Stoudemire (11)
| Raymond Felton (14)
| Madison Square Garden19,812
| 13–22
|- style="background:#cfc;"
| 36 
| January 11
| @ Philadelphia
| 
| Amar'e Stoudemire (21)
| Carmelo Anthony (9)
| Carmelo Anthony (7)
| Wells Fargo Center16,278
| 14–22
|- style="background:#cfc;"
| 37 
| January 13
| Phoenix
| 
| Carmelo Anthony (29) 
| Carmelo Anthony (16)
| Carmelo Anthony (4)
| Madison Square Garden19,812
| 15–22
|- style="background:#fcc;"
| 38 
| January 14
| @ Charlotte
| 
| Carmelo Anthony (20)
| Kenyon Martin & Carmelo Anthony (6) 
| Beno Udrih (5)
| Time Warner Cable Arena15,156
| 15–23
|- style="background:#fcc;"
| 39 
| January 16
| @ Indiana
| 
| Carmelo Anthony (28)
| Tyson Chandler (9)
| Raymond Felton (5)
| Bankers Life Fieldhouse18,165
| 15–24
|- style="background:#fcc;"
| 40 
| January 17
| L.A. Clippers
| 
| Carmelo Anthony (26)
| Carmelo Anthony (20)
| Raymond Felton (9)
| Madison Square Garden19,812
| 15–25
|- style="background:#fcc;"
| 41 
| January 20
| Brooklyn
| 
| Carmelo Anthony (26) 
| Carmelo Anthony (12) 
| Raymond Felton (6)
| Madison Square Garden19,812
| 15–26
|- style="background:#fcc;"
| 42 
| January 22
| Philadelphia
| 
| Carmelo Anthony (28) 
| Tyson Chandler (14)
| Felton, Anthony (7) 
| Madison Square Garden19,812
| 15–27
|- style="background:#cfc;"
| 43 
| January 24
| Charlotte
| 
| Carmelo Anthony (62)
| Carmelo Anthony (13)
| Raymond Felton (5) 
| Madison Square Garden19,812
| 16–27
|- style="background:#cfc;"
| 44 
| January 26
| L.A. Lakers
| 
| Carmelo Anthony (35)
| Tyson Chandler (14)
| Carmelo Anthony & Raymond Felton (5)
| Madison Square Garden19,812
| 17–27
|- style="background:#cfc;"
| 45 
| January 28
| Boston
| 
| Carmelo Anthony (24)
| Tyson Chandler (13)
| Raymond Felton (8)
| Madison Square Garden19,812
| 18–27
|- style="background:#cfc;"
| 46 
| January 30
| Cleveland
| 
| Carmelo Anthony & Tim Hardaway Jr (29)
| Tyson Chandler (8)
| Raymond Felton (8)
| Madison Square Garden19,812
| 19–27

|- style="background:#fcc;"
| 47 
| February 1
| Miami
| 
| Carmelo Anthony (26)
| Tyson Chandler (11)
| Raymond Felton & Carmelo Anthony (4)
| Madison Square Garden19,812
| 19–28
|- style="background:#fcc;"
| 48 
| February 3
| @ Milwaukee
| 
| Carmelo Anthony (36)
| Tyson Chandler (11)
| Raymond Felton (7)
| BMO Harris Bradley Center11,147
| 19–29
|- style="background:#fcc;"
| 49 
| February 5
| Portland
| 
| Carmelo Anthony (26)
| Tyson Chandler (9)
| Pablo Prigioni (7)
| Madison Square Garden19,812
| 19–30
|- style="background:#cfc;"
| 50 
| February 7
| Denver
| 
| Carmelo Anthony (31)
| Jeremy Tyler (11)
| Raymond Felton (8)
| Madison Square Garden19,812
| 20–30
|- style="background:#fcc;"
| 51 
| February 9
| @ Oklahoma City
| 
| Stoudemire & Felton (16)
| Anthony, Chandler & Felton (7)
| Raymond Felton (7)
| Chesapeake Energy Arena18,203
| 20–31
|- style="background:#fcc;"
| 52 
| February 12
| Sacramento
|  
| Carmelo Anthony (36)
| Anthony & Chandler (11)
| Raymond Felton (12)
| Madison Square Garden19,812
| 20–32
|- align="center"
|colspan="9" bgcolor="#bbcaff"|All-Star Break
|- style="background:#fcc;"
| 53 
| February 18
| @ Memphis
| 
| Tim Hardaway Jr (23)
| Carmelo Anthony (11)
| Pablo Prigioni (10)
| FedExForum17,317
| 20–33
|- style="background:#cfc;"
| 54 
| February 19
| @ New Orleans
| 
| Carmelo Anthony (42)
| Tyson Chandler (11)
| Raymond Felton (8)
| Smoothie King Center16,495
| 21–33
|- style="background:#fcc;"
| 55 
| February 21
| @ Orlando
| 
| Carmelo Anthony (44)
| Anthony & Chandler (11)
| Raymond Felton (8)
| Amway Center16,498
| 21–34
|- style="background:#fcc;"
| 56 
| February 22
| @ Atlanta
| 
| Carmelo Anthony (35)
| Tyson Chandler (23)
| Raymond Felton (10)
| Philips Arena19,045
| 21–35
|- style="background:#fcc;"
| 57 
| February 24
| Dallas
| 
| Carmelo Anthony (44)
| Tyson Chandler (12)
| Felton & Smith (7)
| Madison Square Garden19,812
| 21–36
|- style="background:#fcc;"
| 58 
| February 27
| @ Miami
| 
| Carmelo Anthony (29)
| Tyson Chandler (16)
| Felton & Smith (5)
| American Airlines Arena19,634
| 21–37
|- style="background:#fcc;"
| 59 
| February 28
| Golden State
| 
| Carmelo Anthony (23)
| Carmelo Anthony (16)
| Felton & Chandler (3)
| Madison Square Garden19,812
| 21–38

|- style="background:#fcc;"
| 60 
| March 2
| @ Chicago
|  
| Carmelo Anthony (21)
| Tyson Chandler (22)
| Raymond Felton (4)
| United Center21,739
| 21–39
|- style="background:#fcc;"
| 61 
| March 3
| @ Detroit
| 
| Carmelo Anthony (28)
| Tyson Chandler (18)
| Raymond Felton (5)
| Palace of Auburn Hills14,742
| 21–40
|- style="background:#cfc;"
| 62 
| March 5
| @ Minnesota
| 
| Carmelo Anthony (33)
| Tyson Chandler (14)
| Raymond Felton (8)
| Target Center14,294
| 22–40
|- style="background:#cfc;"
| 63 
| March 7
| Utah
| 
| Carmelo Anthony (29)
| Tyson Chandler (11)
| Carmelo Anthony (8)
| Madison Square Garden19,812
| 23–40
|- style="background:#cfc;"
| 64 
| March 8
| @ Cleveland
|  
| Carmelo Anthony (26)
| Amar'e Stoudemire (12)
| Raymond Felton (6)
| Quicken Loans Arena20,562
| 24–40
|- style="background:#cfc;"
| 65 
| March 10
| Philadelphia
| 
| Tim Hardaway Jr. (28)
| Carmelo Anthony (9)
| Anthony & Smith (5)
| Madison Square Garden19,812
| 25–40
|- style="background:#cfc;"
| 66 
| March 12
| @ Boston
| 
| Carmelo Anthony (34)
| Cole Aldrich (10)
| four players (4)
| TD Garden18,624
| 26–40
|- style="background:#cfc;"
| 67 
| March 15
| Milwaukee
| 
| Carmelo Anthony (23)
| J.R. Smith (8)
| J.R. Smith (4)
| Madison Square Garden19,812
| 27–40
|- style="background:#cfc;"
| 68 
| March 19
| Indiana
| 
| Carmelo Anthony (34)
| Tyson Chandler (14)
| Raymond Felton (6)
| Madison Square Garden19,812
| 28–40
|- style="background:#cfc;"
| 69 
| March 21
| @ Philadelphia
| 
| Amar'e Stoudemire (22)
| Stoudemire & Chandler (10)
| Pablo Prigioni (9)
| Wells Fargo Center12,745
| 29–40
|- style="background:#fcc;"
| 70 
| March 23
| Cleveland
| 
| Carmelo Anthony (32)
| Carmelo Anthony (8)
| Raymond Felton (8)
| Madison Square Garden19,812
| 29–41
|- style="background:#fcc;"
| 71 
| March 25
| @ L.A. Lakers
| 
| Carmelo Anthony (29)
| Carmelo Anthony (9)
| Raymond Felton (6)
| Staples Center18,997
| 29–42
|- style="background:#cfc;"
| 72 
| March 26
| @ Sacramento
| 
| Carmelo Anthony (36)
| Tyson Chandler (8)
| Raymond Felton (10)
| Sleep Train Arena15,594
| 30–42
|- style="background:#fcc;"
| 73 
| March 28
| @ Phoenix
| 
| Carmelo Anthony (21)
| Anthony & Chandler (7)
| Raymond Felton (4)
| US Airways Center17,106
| 30–43
|- style="background:#cfc;"
| 74 
| March 30
| @ Golden State
| 
| J.R. Smith (21)
| Amar'e Stoudemire (13)
| Raymond Felton (4)
| Oracle Arena19,596
| 31–43
|- style="background:#cfc;"
| 75 
| March 31
| @ Utah
| 
| Carmelo Anthony (34)
| Tyson Chandler (9)
| Raymond Felton (6)
| EnergySolutions Arena18,653
| 32–43

|- style="background:#cfc;"
| 76 
| April 2
| Brooklyn
| 
| J.R. Smith (24)
| Carmelo Anthony (10)
| J.R. Smith (6)
| Madison Square Garden19,812
| 33–43
|- style="background:#fcc;"
| 77 
| April 4
| Washington
| 
| J.R. Smith (32)
| Anthony & Chandler (8)
| Prigioni & Felton (7)
| Madison Square Garden19,812
| 33–44
|- style="background:#fcc;"
| 78 
| April 6
| @ Miami
| 
| J.R. Smith (32)
| Tyson Chandler (11)
| Carmelo Anthony (6)
| American Airlines Arena19,647
| 33–45
|- style="background:#cfc;"
| 79 
| April 11
| @ Toronto
| 
| Carmelo Anthony (30)
| Amar'e Stoudemire (11)
| Pablo Prigioni (5)
| Air Canada Centre19,800
| 34–45
|- style="background:#cfc;"
| 80 
| April 13
| Chicago
| 
| Tim Hardaway Jr. (20)
| Tyson Chandler (12)
| Raymond Felton (7)
| Madison Square Garden19,812
| 35–45
|- style="background:#cfc;"
| 81 
| April 15
| @ Brooklyn
| 
| Tim Hardaway Jr. (16)
| Cole Aldrich (13)
| Toure Murry (5)
| Barclays Center17,732
| 36–45
|- style="background:#cfc;"
| 82 
| April 16
| Toronto
| 
| J.R. Smith (30)
| Cole Aldrich (16)
| Pablo Prigioni (3)
| Madison Square Garden19,812
| 37–45

Player statistics

|- align="center"
| 
| 46 || 2 || 7.2 || .541 ||  || .867 || 2.8 || .3 || .2 || .7 || 2.0
|- align="center"
| 
| 77 ||style="background:#ff8c00;"|77 ||style="background:#ff8c00;"|38.7 || .452 || .402 || .848 || 8.1 || 3.1 ||style="background:#ff8c00;"|1.2 || .7 ||style="background:#ff8c00;"|27.4
|- align="center"
| 
| 42 || 39 || 29.9 || .442 || .278 || .824 || 5.3 || 1.1 || .3 ||style="background:#ff8c00;"|1.2 || 13.3
|- align="center"
| 
| 19 || 0 || 7.8 || .421 ||  || .667 || .8 || .2 || .6 || .0 || 2.1
|- align="center"
| 
| 55 || 55 || 30.2 ||style="background:#ff8c00;"|.593 || .000 || .632 ||style="background:#ff8c00;"|9.6 || 1.1 || .7 || 1.1 || 8.7
|- align="center"
| 
| 9 || 0 || 7.8 || .333 || .167 || .800 || 1.8 || .2 || .1 || .7 || 2.6
|- align="center"
| 
| 65 || 65 || 31.0 || .395 || .318 || .721 || 3.0 ||style="background:#ff8c00;"|5.6 ||style="background:#ff8c00;"|1.2 || .4 || 9.7
|- align="center"
| 
|style="background:#ff8c00;"|81 || 1 || 23.1 || .428 || .363 || .828 || 1.5 || .8 || .5 || .1 || 10.2
|- align="center"
| 
| 32 || 15 || 19.8 || .512 || .000 || .579 || 4.2 || 1.6 || .8 || .8 || 4.3
|- align="center"
| 
| 51 || 0 || 7.3 || .434 || .417 || .590 || .9 || 1.0 || .4 || .0 || 2.7
|- align="center"
| 
| 66 || 27 || 19.4 || .461 ||style="background:#ff8c00;"|.464 ||style="background:#ff8c00;"|.917 || 2.0 || 3.5 || 1.0 || .0 || 3.8
|- align="center"
| 
| 74 || 58 || 26.5 || .378 || .333 || .746 || 4.2 || 1.7 ||style="background:#ff8c00;"|1.2 || .2 || 6.7
|- align="center"
| 
| 2 || 0 || 1.0 ||  ||  ||  || .0 || .0 || .0 || .0 || .0
|- align="center"
| 
| 74 || 37 || 32.7 || .415 || .394 || .652 || 4.0 || 3.0 || .9 || .3 || 14.5
|- align="center"
| 
| 65 || 21 || 22.6 || .557 ||  || .739 || 4.9 || .5 || .4 || .6 || 11.9
|- align="center"
| 
|  41 || 0 || 9.7 || .517 ||  || .542 || 2.7 || .2 || .1 || .5 || 3.6
|- align="center"
| 
| 31 || 12 || 19.0 || .425 || .425 || .833 || 1.8 || 3.5 || .7 || .1 || 5.6
|- align="center"
| 
| 29 || 1 || 13.4 || .397 || .315 || .625 || 2.0 || .6 || .8 || .3 || 4.8
|}

Awards
 Tim Hardaway Jr. was named to the NBA All-Rookie First Team at the end of the regular season.
 Carmelo Anthony was named Eastern Conference Player of the Week twice. First, for games played from January 6 through January 12, and then for games played from March 3 through March 9. He also led the league in minutes played per game during the regular season.

All-Star
 Carmelo Anthony participated as a starter for the Eastern Conference team in the 2014 NBA All-Star Game. It was the seventh All-Star selection of his career.

Transactions

Overview

 Signed for the rest of the season after two 10-day contracts.
 Was not re-signed after the second 10-day contract expired.
 Waived later in the season.

Trades

See also
 2013–14 NBA season

References

New York Knicks seasons
New York Knicks
2013 in sports in New York City
2014 in sports in New York City
2010s in Manhattan
Madison Square Garden